Rance Hood is an Oklahoma Native artist who echoes traditional Native American culture in his paintings. A self-taught artist, Hood was raised by his maternal grandparents who exposed him to Comanche Indian ways and values.

Early life
Rance Hood was born in the farmlands between Cache and Indiahoma, Oklahoma to a Comanche mother and white father. Hood was the only one of his six siblings to stay with his Comanche maternal grandparents. As a child, Hood and his brother rode horses at their uncle's farm.

Career
Hood eventually started working for Krauss Printing Company (find origin of this)

Style and theme
Hood remained loyal to the traditional art style of Indian art passed down from his ancestors. He started out using oils to achieve a look of depth and eventually transitioned to acrylics.

Awards
Over the years, Hood's work has been recognized by numerous awards and prizes. Some of these awards include:

1962 Second and Third, American Indian Exposition, Anadarko, Oklahoma
1963 First, Second, and Third, American Indian Exposition, Anadarko, Oklahoma
1964 First and Second, American Indian Exposition, Anadarko, Oklahoma
1965 Grand Award and First, American Indian Exposition, Anadarko, Oklahoma
1966 Grand Award, Second and Third, American Indian Exposition, Anadarko, Oklahoma
Second, Gallup Inter-Tribal Ceremonial, Gallup, New Mexico
Honorable Mention, Texas-Oklahoma, sidewalk art show, Oklahoma City, Oklahoma
1968 War Dance, Honorable Mention, Philbrook Art Center, Tulsa, Oklahoma
1969 Second and Grand Award, American Indian Exposition, Anadarko, Oklahoma
The Comanche, Honorable Mention, Philbrook Art Center, Tulsa, Oklahoma
1970 Eagle Dance, First, Philbrook Art Center, Tulsa, Oklahoma
1972 Grand Award, American Indian Exposition, Anadarko, Oklahoma
1985 Western Writers Cover Art Award
American Artists Lithograph Competition for Poster Art
1986 Award of Merit, Colors of the Heartland
Reyna's Galleries, San Juan Bautista, California
First Anniversary Indian Market, First Place and Special Award, Santa Fe, New Mexico
Artists Out of Your Gourd, Ribbon, Charity auction of painted gourds, Santa Fe, New Mexico

Commissions
1971 Designs for Theater Sets, Indian Theater Ensemble at Cafe La Mama Theater, New York City, New York
1987 Film Indian, Sculpture, American Indian Film Festival anniversary award
Medallion, Comanche Nation Commemorative Emblem, Franklin Mint
To Father Sky Mother Earth, poster, Oglala Sioux Rights Fund
Eagle, exterior design, Turbo West Aircraft Company, Cheyenne III Jet, Broomfield, Colorado
1989 Wooden Easter Egg for Easter at the White House, American artists egg exhibit
1990 Fleeing from the Spirit Winds and Emerging Power, posters, published by the American Indian Film Festival, XIV
2005 Illustrations for Blood of Our Earth: Poetic History of the American Indian by Dan C. Jones, University of New Mexico Press, Albuquerque
2005 Palo Duro Holocaust, mural for Comanche Nation Tribal Museum, Lawton, Oklahoma

Private collections
Hood's work is featured in several private collections, some of which include:
Al Unser Jr.
Reba McEntire
Stevie Nicks
Carlos Santana
Jimmy Connors
Joe Walsh
Johnny Rodriguez
Joseph Coors
Michael Martin Murphey

References

External links
Oklahoma Native Artists Oral History Project -- OSU Library

1941 births
Living people